Herbie: Fully Loaded is a 2005 American sports comedy film directed by Angela Robinson from a screenplay by Thomas Lennon, Robert Ben Garant, Alfred Gough, and Miles Millar. The film is the sixth installment in the Herbie film series, following the television film The Love Bug (1997), and the first theatrical film since Herbie Goes Bananas (1980). It serves as a direct sequel to the previous films. The film stars Lindsay Lohan, Justin Long, Breckin Meyer, Matt Dillon, and Michael Keaton. It features cameos by many NASCAR drivers, including Jeff Gordon, Jimmie Johnson, Tony Stewart, and Dale Jarrett.

Herbie: Fully Loaded had its premiere at the Las Vegas Motor Speedway on May 10, 2005, and was released in the United States on June 22, by Buena Vista Pictures Distribution. The film received mixed reviews from critics, but was a box-office success, grossing over $144 million against a budget of $50 million.

Plot
Herbie, a Volkswagen Beetle with a mind of its own, is decommissioned and towed to a junkyard after losing several races. Maggie Peyton is the youngest member of the Peyton racing clan. Her father, Ray Peyton Sr., takes her to the junkyard to buy her a car as a college graduation present, and she chooses Herbie. Herbie then takes Maggie to her mechanic friend Kevin who agrees to take Herbie to a car show to buy parts. Herbie tricks Maggie into disguising herself in a racing suit and helmet and challenging NASCAR champion Trip Murphy to an impromptu race, which Herbie wins by a hair.

Kevin happily suggests that Maggie should race again, but Ray Sr. is concerned, having forbidden Maggie to race due to a street racing accident years ago. Trip becomes obsessed with Herbie and the mysterious driver and organizes a local racing competition to lure Herbie back for a rematch, which Maggie and Kevin enter. Herbie and Maggie easily defeat the other competitors and qualify for the final match with Trip, but when Trip talks Maggie into racing for pink slips, Herbie's jealousy over Maggie's desire to win Trip's stock car causes him and Maggie to lose the race. Maggie is publicly embarrassed, Herbie is towed away, and both Kevin and Ray Sr. express their disappointment with Maggie over her respective actions.

However, encouraged by her friend Charisma, Maggie decides to race professionally. She tries to buy Herbie back from Trip, but Trip has entered Herbie in a demolition derby. Desperate to save Herbie from destruction, Maggie goes to the derby, runs onto the field while the derby is in progress, quickly apologizes and pleads with Herbie to help her, and an overjoyed Herbie accepts her back as his driver; the two manage to escape destruction and win the derby.

Meanwhile, the Peyton racing team may have to forfeit an upcoming NASCAR Nextel Cup Series race due to financial troubles and two crashes by the team's driver and Maggie's brother, Ray Peyton Jr.. Ray Sr. refuses to let Maggie drive for the team, but Ray Jr. decides on his own that she will take his place and sends the Team Peyton crew to help her and Kevin prepare Herbie for the race. At the race track, Maggie and Herbie have a heart-to-heart conversation, and Trip ominously warns Maggie that the race will be dangerous.

Herbie starts the race slowly, but he eventually catches up and begins passing the other cars before Maggie makes her first pit stop. Meanwhile, Ray Sr., who has been watching the race at home, decides to join the crowd in person. On the track again, Herbie is soon boxed in by some other cars, but Ray Sr. arrives at the track and encourages Maggie over the team radio, and Maggie escapes the trap by driving directly over Tony Stewart’s car in front of her, damaging Herbie's oil system. Maggie makes another pit stop and Kevin hurriedly extracts a replacement part from the yellow New Beetle, which Herbie has been eyeing amorously throughout the film, owned by Sally, one of Team Peyton's few remaining sponsors. The jerry-rigged oil system is fragile, and Trip is intent on preventing Herbie from winning.

With Maggie, Herbie, and Ray Sr. now working together, Maggie and Herbie catch up to Trip. Trip, bent on defeating Herbie once and for all, tries to damage Herbie by pushing him into the track wall when Maggie tries to pass him, but he is caught off guard and crashes into the wall when she slams on the brakes during his next attempt, resulting in him hitting Jeff Gordon. Herbie passes Trip's car, now upside down on the track, by climbing onto the fence above the wall. After landing back on the track, Maggie and Herbie win the race, and Maggie becomes the next Peyton to win a NASCAR race. Maggie is congratulated by her father and brother, and Trip (who is believed to be insane when he tries to convince others that Herbie is sentient) is driven away in an ambulance as Maggie and Kevin kiss. The film ends with Ray speaking with Herbie and Sally's New Beetle (which is revealed to have a mind of its own as well), telling them not to stay out too long on their date as Herbie has another race coming up.

Cast

 Lindsay Lohan as Margaret "Maggie" Peyton, a college graduate who later falls for Herbie, before becoming a NASCAR driver at the end of the film
 Justin Long as Kevin, Maggie's love interest.
 Matt Dillon as Trip Murphy, a NASCAR driver who wants to prevent Herbie from winning. He drives a Pontiac GTO, a Chevrolet Corvette, and a Chevrolet Monte Carlo that he uses in NASCAR.
 Michael Keaton as Ray Peyton Sr., Maggie's father.
 Breckin Meyer as Ray Peyton, Jr., Maggie's brother
 Cheryl Hines as Sally
 Thomas Lennon as Larry Murphy
 Jimmi Simpson as Crash, Trip Murphy's tech assistant 
 Jill Ritchie as Charisma
 Jeremy Roberts as Crazy Dave
 Monica Manning as Monica Armstrong

Director Angela Robinson stated in an interview that she attempted to have Dean Jones reprise his role as Jim Douglas for a cameo, but due to scheduling problems he was unable to do so. This circulated false rumors alleging Jones had filmed the cameo and the scene had been deleted.

Several racing personalities appear in cameo roles as themselves, including UNH announcer Allen Bestwick, 1973 NASCAR champion Benny Parsons and ESPN broadcaster Stuart Scott. Various real-life NASCAR drivers and/or their cars from the 2004 racing season can also be seen, including Dale Jarrett, Dale Earnhardt Jr. (car only), Casey Mears (car only), Kasey Kahne, Jeremy Mayfield (car only), Tony Stewart, J. J. Yeley, Bobby Labonte (car only), Terry Labonte (car only), Brendan Gaughan, Mark Martin (car only), Ward Burton (car only), Carl Edwards (car only), Jimmy Spencer (car only), Mike Bliss (car only), Scott Wimmer (car only), Greg Biffle (car only), Jamie McMurray (car only), Rusty Wallace (car only), Brian Vickers, Jeff Gordon, Jimmie Johnson, Kyle Busch, Kurt Busch (car only),  Elliott Sadler (car only), Matt Kenseth (car only), Michael Waltrip (car only), Ryan Newman (car only), Scott Riggs (car only), Boris Said, Joe Nemechek (car only), Bill Elliott (car only), Sterling Marlin (car only), Jeff Burton (car only), Ken Schrader (car only), Morgan Shepherd (car only), Jeff Fuller (car only), Bobby Hamilton Jr. (car only), Robby Gordon (car only), and Kevin Harvick (car only).

Production and marketing
In their 2011 screenwriting how-to book Writing Movies For Fun (And Profit), Robert Ben Garant & Thomas Lennon, two of the film's co-writers, explained their original starting idea for the Herbie remake: "We are both very big fans of the old The Love Bug movies... but the old Herbie movies are corny in a way you can't get away with today... We needed to put Herbie in a much more real world. Not some dopey, illogical, kids-movie world, with characters like the crotchety old junk lot owner twirling his mustache and swearing, 'I'm gonna get that little car if it's the last thing I ever do!!!' Kids hate that kind of stupid shit as much as grown-ups do... We set it in a very realistically portrayed world of San Fernando Valley street racing: a macho world, where an old, beat-up car would get laughed at -- then be totally respected when it won some races."

They further elucidated on the experience: "We turned in the first draft, and the movie was greenlit... They were that confident of the movie. Off the first draft... [but] here's where it gets interesting/horrible. We were no longer dealing directly with [then-Disney president Bob Iger]. We were now dealing with a studio executive under the president. This executive was not in the room when we sold the pitch. This executive was not there when [Iger] gave us notes on the script... This executive had no agenda. This exec wasn't making a power play. This executive just genuinely didn't understand the movie and what [Iger] had liked about it."

Principal photography began on August 2, 2004 in Los Angeles and wrapped up later that same November. During the 2005 NASCAR Nextel Cup Series season, drivers Dale Jarrett and Scott Riggs ran special paint schemes to promote the film.

The film began in 2004, was reported to include heavy uses of product placement. For example, Maggie Peyton is a former reporter for ESPN (owned by Disney) turned NASCAR driver. A huge billboard for Mid America Motorworks (an aftermarket parts supplier for classic Volkswagens and other vehicles) is seen in the background of the scene where Murphy attempts to sabotage Herbie. In addition, Volkswagen provided a Volkswagen Touareg and a Volkswagen New Beetle for use in certain scenes, General Motors also provided the 2005 Chevrolet Corvette and 2005 Pontiac GTO for use in race scenes as well.

Various race cars in the Nextel Cup Series appear during the race at the end, with action sequences being filmed during the 2004 Pop Secret 500 race at California Speedway in September 4–5, 2004. Dale Earnhardt Jr.'s No. 8 car is seen briefly, but it has all the Budweiser logos removed and replaced with his signature to avoid advertising alcohol in a children's film. In addition, billboards can be seen in straightaway scenes, some with the NEXTEL logo on them. Also, in the scene where Maggie pretends to drive a stock car in the junkyard, Dominic Toretto's 1970 Dodge Charger from The Fast and the Furious can be seen among the cars. KITT from the classic Knight Rider series also makes a cameo in the newspaper during the opening sequence. ABC Family aired a making-of featurette titled Herbie: Fully Loaded and Retooled, hosted by Lohan, in June 21, 2005, to promote the film release.

Reception

Box office
In its opening weekend, the film grossed $12,709,221 in 3,521 theaters in the United States and Canada, ranking number four at the box office. By the end of its run, Herbie: Fully Loaded grossed $66,023,816 domestically and $78,123,000 internationally, totaling $144,146,816 worldwide.

Critical response
On Rotten Tomatoes, the film has a rating of 40% based on 144 reviews. The site's consensus states that "Herbie: Fully Loaded is a decent kids movie that is pretty undemanding for adult viewers." The film is the second-lowest rated entry in the franchise, with Herbie Goes Bananas scoring a 40% rating. On Metacritic, it has a weighted average score of 47% based on reviews from 31 critics, indicating "mixed or average reviews". Audiences surveyed by CinemaScore gave the film a grade "A" on a scale of A to F.

Roger Ebert gave the film a two out of four stars, stating: "The movie is pretty cornball. Little kids would probably enjoy it, but their older brothers and sisters will be rolling their eyes, and their parents will be using their iPods." William Thomas of Empire Magazine gave the film a two out of five stars and said: "Every bit as good (and bad) as Herbie Goes Bananas; but the Love Bug deserves better performances."

Awards
At the 2006 Kids' Choice Awards, Lohan won "Favorite Female Actress" for her role. The film was also nominated for "Favorite Movie" but lost to Harry Potter and the Goblet of Fire.

Soundtrack

The soundtrack album was released on June 21, 2005. It includes Lohan's 2004 song "First", and remakes of classic songs by Walt Disney Records artists including Aly & A.J., Caleigh Peters, Ingram Hill and Josh Kelley, and big names such as Lionel Richie and Mark McGrath. The album does not, however, contain any of Mark Mothersbaugh's original score for the film.

Despite most of the songs' original recordings appearing in the film itself, the soundtrack contains remakes exclusive to the album. For example, the Beach Boys' original recording of "Getcha Back" is used for the film's opening credits, but the Mark McGrath cover is featured on the soundtrack.

The Girls Aloud single "Long Hot Summer" was planned to be included, but was cut from the final film.

 Lindsay Lohan – "First"
 Mark McGrath – "Getcha Back" – The Beach Boys cover (1985)
 Aly & AJ – "Walking on Sunshine" – Katrina and the Waves cover (1985)
 Caleigh Peters – "Fun, Fun, Fun" – The Beach Boys cover (1964)
 Pilot – "Magic"
 Josh Gracin – "Working for the Weekend" – Loverboy cover (1981)
 The Donnas – "Roll On Down the Highway" – Bachman–Turner Overdrive cover (1974)
 The Mooney Suzuki – "Born to Be Wild" – Steppenwolf cover (1968)
 Ingram Hill – "More Than a Feeling" – Boston cover (1976)
 Rooney – "Metal Guru" – T. Rex cover (1972)
 Josh Kelley – "You Are the Woman" – Firefall cover (1976)
 Lionel Richie – "Hello"
 Mavin – "Welcome to My World"
 Black Smoke Organization – Herbie: Fully Loaded remix
 Black Smoke Organization – "Herbie vs. NASCAR"

Video game

Notes

References

External links

 
 
 
 

2005 films
2005 comedy films
2000s adventure comedy films
2000s sports comedy films
2000s teen comedy films
American adventure comedy films
American sequel films
American sports comedy films
American teen comedy films
2000s English-language films
6
Films about women's sports
Films directed by Angela Robinson
Films scored by Mark Mothersbaugh
Films set in California
Films shot in Los Angeles
Films shot in Vancouver
NASCAR mass media
Teen adventure films
Teen sports films
Walt Disney Pictures films
2000s American films